Rodrigo Cruzado Caballero was a Roman Catholic prelate who served as Auxiliary Bishop of Cuenca (1652–?) and Titular Bishop of Usula (1652–?).

Biography
On 8 January 1652, Rodrigo Cruzado Caballero was appointed during the papacy of Pope Innocent X as Auxiliary Bishop of Cuenca and Titular Bishop of Usula.
On 21 January 1652, he was consecrated bishop by Marcantonio Franciotti, Cardinal-Priest of Santa Maria della Pace, with Ranuccio Scotti Douglas, Bishop Emeritus of Borgo San Donnino, and Patrizio Donati, Bishop Emeritus of Minori, serving as co-consecrators.
It is uncertain how long he served.

References 

17th-century Roman Catholic bishops in Spain
Bishops appointed by Pope Innocent X